Steers & Stripes is the seventh studio album by American country music duo Brooks & Dunn. It was released in April 2001 via Arista Nashville. The album produced five singles on the US Billboard Hot Country Singles & Tracks chart, of which the first three reached number one. "Ain't Nothing 'bout You", the first single, became the duo's biggest hit, not only spending six weeks at the top of the country chart, but also reaching No. 25 on the Billboard Hot 100. The song was also declared by Billboard as the number-one country song of 2001. Following it were "Only in America" and "The Long Goodbye" (the latter of which was later a pop hit for Ronan Keating, co-written with Paul Brady). The last two singles were the No. 5 "My Heart Is Lost to You" and the No. 12 "Every River".

The track "The Last Thing I Do" was also recorded by James Otto for his debut album Days of Our Lives, and by Montgomery Gentry for their 2004 album You Do Your Thing (as "If It's the Last Thing I Do").

Track listing

Chart performance

Weekly charts

Year-end charts

Personnel

Bob Bailey – background vocals
Kix Brooks – lead vocals, background vocals
J. T. Corenflos – electric guitar
Eric Darken – percussion
Greg Davis – banjo
Dan Dugmore – acoustic guitar, steel guitar
Ronnie Dunn – lead vocals, background vocals
Kim Fleming – background vocals
Shannon Forrest – drums
Paul Franklin – steel guitar, Dobro
Kenny Greenberg – electric guitar
Vicki Hampton – background vocals
Aubrey Haynie – fiddle
B. James Lowry – acoustic guitar
Brent Mason – electric guitar, gut string guitar
Mindi Abair – saxophone
Gene Miller – background vocals
Steve Nathan – keyboards, synthesizer, piano, Hammond B-3 organ
Michael Rhodes – bass guitar
Kim Richey – background vocals
Chris Rodriguez – background vocals
Brent Rowan – acoustic guitar, electric guitar
John Wesley Ryles – background vocals
Harry Stinson – background vocals
Trisha Yearwood – background vocals

Strings by The Nashville String Machine arranged and conducted by David Campbell.

References

External links
[ Allmusic.com: Album review]

2001 albums
Brooks & Dunn albums
Arista Records albums
Albums produced by Mark Wright (record producer)